The 2020 United States House of Representatives elections in North Carolina were held on November 3, 2020, to elect the 13 U.S. representatives from the state of North Carolina, one from each of the state's 13 congressional districts. The elections coincided with the 2020 U.S. presidential election, as well as other elections to the House of Representatives, elections to the United States Senate and various state and local elections.

Following a 2019 court order, the North Carolina General Assembly passed a bill with new Congressional districts for the 2020 elections. Among other changes, the 2nd and 6th districts were drawn to be more urban. Those changes led the two incumbents in these districts, George Holding and Mark Walker, respectively, to retire. Both were Republicans, and Democrats won the newly redrawn districts. One other seat was open, as former Rep. Mark Meadows had resigned to become White House Chief of Staff, but a fellow Republican held that seat for the party. Incumbents won all elections in which they ran, with the 8th district (Richard Hudson) seat having the closest margin of victory.

Results summary

Statewide

District
Results of the 2020 United States House of Representatives elections in North Carolina by district:

District 1

The 1st district encompasses the Inner Banks, taking in Greenville, Henderson, & Roanoke Rapids. Following redistricting, the district remained relatively the same but lost its share of Durham and Granville counties. In its place it gained Nash, Wayne, and Greene counties. It also increased its share of Wilson and Pitt counties. The incumbent is Democrat G. K. Butterfield, who was re-elected with 69.9% of the vote in 2018.

Democratic primary

Candidates

Nominee
G. K. Butterfield, incumbent U.S. Representative

Republican primary

Candidates

Nominee 
 Sandy Smith, business executive and farmer

Eliminated in primary
Ethan Baca, businessman
Jim Glisson
Michele Nix, former vice chairwoman of the North Carolina Republican Party and candidate for North Carolina's 3rd congressional district in 2019

Primary results

General election

Endorsements

Predictions

Results

District 2

The 2nd district takes in much of Wake County portion of the Research Triangle region. Following redistricting, the 2nd district is now located entirely in Wake County, taking in Raleigh, Cary, Garner, Apex, Holly Springs, Fuquay-Varina, and Morrisville. Wake Forest and Rocky Mount as well as the rural parts of the district were removed from the district. The incumbent is Republican George Holding, who was re-elected with 51.3% of the vote in 2018. On December 6, 2019, Holding announced he would not seek re-election, after his congressional district was drawn to be more favorable to the Democratic Party.

Republican primary

Candidates

Nominee
Alan Swain, attorney

Declined
George Holding, incumbent U.S. Representative

Democratic primary

Candidates

Nominee 
 Deborah K. Ross, former state representative and nominee for U.S. Senate in 2016

Eliminated in primary
Monika Johnson-Hostler, Wake County school board-member
Ollie Nelson, retired U.S. Marine, educator, and pastor
Andy Terrell, former Obama administration official

Withdrawn
Scott Cooper, nonprofit director and former U.S. Marine Corps lieutenant colonel

Declined
Sam Searcy, state senator

Endorsements

Polling

Primary results

Libertarian primary

Candidates

Nominee
Jeff Matemu, attorney and candidate for North Carolina's 2nd congressional district in 2018

General election

Predictions

Results

District 3

The 3rd district is located on the Eastern North Carolina shore and covers the Outer Banks and counties along the Pamlico Sound. Republican Walter B. Jones Jr., who was re-elected unopposed in 2018, died on February 10, 2019, and a special election was held to fill the vacancy. The incumbent is Republican Greg Murphy, who won the special election with 61.7% of the vote. The district remained relatively unchanged following redistricting.

Republican primary

Candidates

Nominee
Greg Murphy, incumbent U.S. Representative

Democratic primary

Candidates

Nominee
Daryl Farrow

General election

Predictions

Results

District 4

The 4th district takes in the part of the Research Triangle area not located in Wake County including Chapel Hill and Durham. Redistricting resulted in it losing its share of Raleigh, instead picking up northern Wake County, taking in Wake Forest, Zebulon, Rolesville, and Knightdale, as well as Chatham County, Durham County, Franklin County and Granville County. The incumbent is Democrat David Price, who was re-elected with 72.4% of the vote in 2018.

Democratic primary

Candidates

Nominee 
 David Price, incumbent U.S. Representative

Eliminated in primary
Daniel Ulysses Lockwood, web & graphic designer and developer

Endorsements

Primary results

Republican primary

Candidates

Nominee
 Robert Thomas, attorney

Eliminated in primary
Steve Von Loor, nominee for North Carolina's 4th congressional district in 2018
Debesh Sarkar, structural engineer
Nasir Shaikh

Primary results

General election

Endorsements

Predictions

Results

District 5

The 5th district is based in mostly rural mountainous areas of northwestern North Carolina. Redistricting moved the district to the west and south, resulting in it losing the city of Winston-Salem and picking up many rural counties in western North Carolina. It lost its share of Surry, Stokes, Yadkin, and Forsyth counties to the 10th district. It also lost Avery County to the 11th district. In its place it picked up Gaston County, Cleveland County, part of Rutherford County, as well as Burke and Caldwell counties. A small portion in northwest Catawba County is also in the district. The incumbent is Republican Virginia Foxx, who was re-elected with 57.0% of the vote in 2018.

Republican primary

Candidates

Nominee
Virginia Foxx, incumbent U.S. Representative

Declined
Tracy Philbeck, Gaston County commissioner

Endorsements

Democratic primary

Candidates

Nominee 
David Brown, IT consultant and nominee for North Carolina's 10th congressional district in 2018

Eliminated in primary 
Eric Hughes

Primary results

Third parties

Candidates

Declared
Jeff Gregory (Constitution)

General election

Endorsements

Predictions

Results

District 6

Following redistricting, the 6th district now encompasses all of Guilford County, including Greensboro as well as taking in Winston-Salem from neighboring Forsyth County. Most of the district's rural portions were moved to the 10th and the 13th districts. The incumbent is Republican Mark Walker, who was re-elected with 56.5% of the vote in 2018. On December 16, 2019, Walker announced he would not seek re-election, citing his redrawn district becoming significantly more Democratic as his primary reason.

Republican primary

Candidates

Nominee
Lee Haywood, chairman of the 6th district North Carolina Republican Party

Eliminated in primary
Laura Pichardo, accounts-payable analyst

Declined
Mark Walker, incumbent U.S. Representative

Primary results

Democratic primary

Candidates

Nominee
 Kathy Manning, lawyer and nominee for North Carolina's 13th congressional district in 2018

Eliminated in primary
Bruce Davis, former Guilford County commissioner
Rhonda Foxx, former chief of staff to U.S. Representative Alma Adams
Ed Hanes, former state representative
 Derwin Montgomery, state representative

Withdrawn
Angela Flynn, lay minister (endorsed Kathy Manning)

Endorsements

Primary results

Third parties

Candidates

Declared
Jennyfer Bucardo (Independent)

General election

Predictions

Results

District 7

The 7th district is located in southeastern North Carolina, taking in Wilmington, as well as stretching into the southern exurbs of Raleigh. After the district was redrawn, it lost its share of Wayne and Duplin counties, while gaining all of Johnston and Bladen counties and a small part of eastern Harnett County. The incumbent is Republican David Rouzer, who was re-elected with 55.5% of the vote in 2018.

Republican primary

Candidates

Nominee
David Rouzer, incumbent U.S. Representative

Disqualified
Pete D'Abrosca, blogger

Democratic primary

Candidates

Nominee
Chris Ward, pharmaceutical sales executive

Eliminated in primary
Robert Colon, wastewater manager
 Mark Judson, retired U.S. Army Officer and businessman

Primary results

General election

Predictions

Results

District 8

The 8th district spans from the Charlotte exurbs of Concord and Kannapolis into Fayetteville, including China Grove, Albemarle, Troy, Pinehurst, Raeford, and Spring Lake. Redistricting resulted in the 8th district losing its share of Rowan County, Hoke County and southern Moore County, while gaining all of Cumberland County, western Harnett County and most of Lee County. The incumbent is Republican Richard Hudson, who was re-elected with 55.3% of the vote in 2018.

Republican primary

Candidates

Nominee
Richard Hudson, incumbent U.S. Representative

Democratic primary

Candidates

Nominee
Patricia Timmons-Goodson, vice chair of the United States Commission on Civil Rights and former Associate Justice of the North Carolina Supreme Court

General election

Endorsements

Predictions

Polling

Results

District 9

The 9th district spans from south Charlotte and its southern suburbs of Matthews and Mint Hill into suburban Fayetteville, including Union, Anson, Richmond, Scotland, and Robeson counties. The district remained vacant after the 2018 elections, following the refusal of the state board of elections to certify the results and an ongoing investigation into absentee ballot fraud, and on February 21, 2019, all five members of the board voted to call a new election.
Redistricting resulted in the district losing its share of Cumberland and Bladen counties, while gaining southern Moore County and Hoke County. The incumbent is Republican Dan Bishop, who won the special election with 50.7% of the vote.

Republican primary

Candidates

Nominee
Dan Bishop, incumbent U.S. Representative

Democratic primary

Candidates

Nominee
 Cynthia Wallace, financial services vice president and chair of the 9th district for the North Carolina Democratic Party

Eliminated in primary
 Clayton Brooks, Baptist minister and first chair of the Wake County Democratic Party
 Harry Southerland, Hoke County commissioner
 Marcus Williams, lawyer

Declined
 Dan McCready, former U.S. Marine, businessman, and nominee for this seat in 2018 & 2019

Primary results

General election

Endorsements

Predictions

Polling

Results

District 10

The 10th district encompasses western North Carolina stretching from the Charlotte suburbs to the South Carolina border. It lost its share of Asheville following redistricting and some of its share of the southwestern Piedmont in south central North Carolina. It gained Rockingham County, Stokes County, Surry County, Yadkin County, Iredell County, as well as part of Forsyth County from the old 5th district. The incumbent is Republican Patrick McHenry, who was re-elected with 59.3% of the vote in 2018.

Republican primary

Candidates

Nominee
Patrick McHenry, incumbent U.S. Representative

Eliminated in primary
David L. Johnson
Ralf Walters

Declined
Mark Walker, incumbent U.S. Representative for North Carolina's 6th congressional district

Primary results

Democratic primary

Candidates

Nominee
David Parker, attorney and former North Carolina Democratic Party chair

General election

Predictions

Results

District 11

The 11th district encompasses most of rural western North Carolina, taking in the Appalachian part of the state. Redistricting resulted in the district gaining all Buncombe County, taking in Asheville. The most recent incumbent was Republican Mark Meadows, who was re-elected with 59.2% of the vote in 2018. On December 19, 2019, Meadows announced he would not run for re-election. In March 2020, Meadows was selected to serve as the 29th White House Chief of Staff, and resigned from his seat in Congress.

Republican primary

Candidates

Nominee
Madison Cawthorn, motivational speaker and businessman

Eliminated in runoff
 Lynda Bennett, businesswoman

Eliminated in primary
Chuck Archerd, candidate for North Carolina's 11th congressional district in 2018
Matthew Burril, pilot and chair of the Asheville Regional Airport Authority Board
Jim Davis, state senator
Dan Driscoll, U.S. Army veteran
Steve Fekete Jr.
Dillon Gentry, sales representative and candidate for North Carolina's 5th congressional district in 2018
Wayne King, deputy chief of staff to U.S. Representative Mark Meadows
Joey Osborne
Vance Patterson, businessman and candidate for North Carolina's 11th congressional district in 2012
Albert Wiley Jr., perennial candidate

Declined
Mark Meadows, former U.S. Representative

Primary results

Endorsements

Runoff results

Democratic primary

Candidates

Nominee
Moe Davis, former U.S. Air Force colonel, US Department of Labor Administrative Law Judge, and former Chief Prosecutor of the Guantanamo military commission

Eliminated in primary
Gina Collias, attorney and Republican candidate for North Carolina's 10th congressional district in 2018
Michael O'Shea, former musical artist and producer
Phillip Price, businessman and nominee for North Carolina's 11th congressional district in 2018
Steve Woodsmall, former U.S. Air Force major and Brevard College professor

Declined
Heath Shuler, former U.S. Representative for North Carolina's 11th congressional district (2007–2013)

Primary results

Third parties

Candidates

Declared
Tracey DeBruhl (Libertarian)
Tamara Zwinak (Green)

General election

Predictions

Endorsements:

Polling

Results

District 12

The 12th district is centered around Charlotte and the surrounding immediate suburbs, including Huntersville, Cornelius, Davidson, and Pineville. Redistricting left the 12th district relatively unchanged, but it gained some southern Charlotte suburbs, including Mint Hill and parts of Matthews. The incumbent is Democrat Alma Adams, who was re-elected with 73.1% of the vote in 2018.

Democratic primary

Candidates

Nominee
Alma Adams, incumbent U.S. Representative

Eliminated in primary
Keith Cradle, youth program director

Primary results

Republican primary

Candidates

Disqualified
Bill Brewster, businessman

General election

Endorsements

Predictions

Results

District 13

Following redistricting, the 13th district lost some of its share of the Piedmont Triad region, losing Greensboro to the 6th district & Iredell County to the 10th district. It retained Davidson County and Davie County and expanded its share of Rowan County. The district also gained most of the rural counties previously in the 6th district, including Randolph County, Alamance County, Caswell County, Person County, and a small section of Chatham County. The incumbent is Republican Ted Budd, who was re-elected with 51.5% of the vote in 2018.

Republican primary

Candidates

Nominee
Ted Budd, incumbent U.S. Representative

Declined
Mark Walker, incumbent U.S. Representative for North Carolina's 6th congressional district

Democratic primary

Candidates

Nominee
Scott Huffman, businessman and candidate for North Carolina's 8th congressional district in 2018

Endorsements

General election

Predictions

Results

See also
 2020 North Carolina elections

Notes

Partisan clients

References

External links
  (State affiliate of the U.S. League of Women Voters)
 
 
 
 

Official campaign websites for 1st district candidates
 G. K. Butterfield (D) for Congress
 Sandy Smith (R) for Congress

Official campaign websites for 2nd district candidates
 Jeff Matemu (L) for Congress
 Deborah K. Ross (D) for Congress
 Alan Swain (R) for Congress

Official campaign websites for 3rd district candidates
 Daryl Farrow (D) for Congress
 Greg Murphy (R) for Congress

Official campaign websites for 4th district candidates
 David Price (D) for Congress
 Robert Thomas (R) for Congress

Official campaign websites for 5th district candidates
 David Brown (D) for Congress
 Virginia Foxx (R) for Congress

Official campaign websites for 6th district candidates
 Jennyfer Bucardo (I) for Congress
 Lee Haywood (R) for Congress
 Kathy Manning (D) for Congress

Official campaign websites for 7th district candidates
 David Rouzer (R) for Congress
 Chris Ward (D) for Congress

Official campaign websites for 8th district candidates
 Richard Hudson (R) for Congress
 Patricia Timmons-Goodson (D) for Congress 

Official campaign websites for 9th district candidates
 Dan Bishop (R) for Congress
 Cynthia Wallace (D) for Congress

Official campaign websites for 10th district candidates
 Patrick McHenry (R) for Congress
 David Parker (D) for Congress

Official campaign websites for 11th district candidates
 Madison Cawthorn (R) for Congress
 Moe Davis (D) for Congress

Official campaign websites for 12th district candidates
 Alma Adams (D) for Congress

Official campaign websites for 13th district candidates
 Ted Budd (R) for Congress
 Scott Huffman (D) for Congress

2020
North Carolina
United States House of Representatives